A battery–capacitor flash (BC flash) is a  flash photography system used with flashbulbs.  Instead of relying directly on the current pulse ability of a photoflash battery to directly fire a flashbulb, a battery is used to charge a capacitor that is then discharged through the flashbulb.  BC flash units use 5.6 V, 15 V, or 22½ V batteries.

Advantages
A special high-current photoflash battery is not needed, and even an ageing battery can charge the capacitor, although recycling more slowly than a fresh one; the charged capacitor delivers a high-current pulse and reliably fires the bulb.

References

 Electronics for Photographers, by Marshall Lincoln, Copyright 1966 by Chilton Books, pp 43–54.
 Capacitors & Batteries, Boston University Physics Department

Flash photography
Photographic lighting